The Hong Kong Chinese Importers' and Exporters' Association (HKCIEA) is a non-profit organization of local Chinese firms and businessman of the import and export industry based in Hong Kong.

Largely regarded as a pro-Beijing group, it has representative in the Legislative Council of Hong Kong through the Import and Export functional constituency and also electoral representatives in the Election Committee which is responsible for the Chief Executive election. The current holder of the seat in the Legislative Council is Wong Ting-kwong of the pro-Beijing Democratic Alliance for the Betterment and Progress of Hong Kong (DAB).

References

Chambers of commerce in Hong Kong
1954 establishments in Hong Kong